Sucha Koszalińska  (formerly German Zuchen) is a village in the administrative district of Gmina Sianów, within Koszalin County, West Pomeranian Voivodeship, in north-western Poland.

For the history of the region, see History of Pomerania.

References

Villages in Koszalin County